Coventry Friary may refer to:

Greyfriars, Coventry (Franciscan Friars Minor, Conventual)
Whitefriars, Coventry (Carmelite)